The 1st European Acrobatics Championships was held in Riga, Latvia SSR, Soviet Union  19–21 May 1978.

Only five countries competed: Soviet Union, Poland, Bulgaria, Great Britain and Hungary.

Results

Medal table

References

External links
European Union of Gymnastics

European Acrobatics Championships
1978 in gymnastics
1978 in Soviet sport
International gymnastics competitions hosted by the Soviet Union
1978 in Latvia
Sports competitions in Riga
May 1978 sports events in Europe